Princess Naniwa no Ono (? – 489) was Empress of Japan as the consort of Emperor Kenzō.

Daughter of Prince Oka-no-Wakugo; great granddaughter of Emperor Yuryaku. 

Committed suicide due to fears over disrespecting Emperor Ninken when he was a Crown Prince.

Notes

Japanese empresses
Year of death missing
5th-century Japanese women
Japanese princesses
489 deaths